Vijayaba Kollaya is a 2019 Sinhalese historical drama directed by Sunil Ariyaratne. The film stars Hemal Ranasinghe, Senali Fonseka and Ashan Dias in lead roles. Rohana Weerasinghe composed the film's soundtrack. The film's screenplay was written by Tissa Abeysekara, the last before his death. The story is based on W. A. Silva's 1938 novel Vijayaba Kollaya on the historical event of the same name. The Vijayabā Kollaya was a succession dispute in 1521 that led to the division of the Kingdom of Kotte and eventually its downfall. The love triangle of Nayanananda, Neelamani and Asanga. In theatres both 2D and 3D.

Plot
In 1505, Lourenço de Almeida, a Portuguese naval ship, landed on Sri Lanka during a voyage during another voyage. The story dated to the legends about King Vijayabahu VII of Kotte and his sons Bhuvanaikabahu VII of Kotte, Mayadunne of Sitawaka and Raigama Bandara princes who succeeded King Parakramabahu IX of Kotte. Neelamani is the daughter of a King's army leader, where one of his warrior Asanga falls love towards Neelamani. However, Nilamani had captured the heart of Nayanananda, a young man from the upcountry worked as a spy. After betrayal, king's men start to find Nayanananda and he hide in army leader's stable. Meanwhile, three sons plan to ascend the throne by killing their father. With several incidents in line, Asanga expressed his love for Neelamni, who refused it due to Nayanananda. Both Nayananada and Asanga went for a war and Asanga promised Neelamani that he will protect Nayanananda. However, Nayanananda is captured during the fight and Neelamani scolds Asanga. Asanga goes to the Portuguese camp where he persuades Nayanananda to escape and Asnga takes his place. He eventually escapes with another girl who happens to be a daughter of an old friend. He returns to Nayanananda and Neelamani who pleads Asanga's forgiveness for her stupidity. Soon after mortally wounded Asanga succumbs to his injuries and passes away

Cast
 Hemal Ranasinghe as Nayananada 
 Senali Fonseka as Neelamani
 Ashan Dias as Asanga
 Preethi Randeniya as Vindunatha
 Buddhika Jayaratne as Kandure Bandara
 Erdley Wedamuni as Nayaka Senevi
 Chulakshi Ranathunga as Hamidumma
 Ariyaratne Kalurachchi as Vijayabahu VI
 Hans Billmoria as Lasarda
 Ryan van Rooyen
 Gavin Ludwyk
 Gayana Sudarshani as Devaki
 Yash Weerasinghe as Mayadunne

Production
Following the successful Sunil Ariyaratne's Paththini in 2016, starring Pooja Umashankar and after completing post production Bimba Devi Alias Yashodhara in 2018, starring Pallavi Subhash, Ariyaratne was announced his next project Vijayaba Kollaya as a film present for celebrating 71st anniversary of Sinhalese Cinema. With cooperation executive film producer Boodee Keerthisena. This was based on Sinhala literature W. A. Silva's novel of the same name. On 21 January 2018, day of Sinhalese Cinema 71st year celebration, Boodee Keerthisena and Sunil Ariyarathne was announced they're next project present to Sinhalese cinema. The muhurath ceremony was held Mathura Restaurant at Bambalapitiya . Boodee producing under the production house Buddhi Films announced that they would produce a film starring Hemal Ranasinghe to be directed by Sunil Ariyarathne.

Songs
The film consists with two songs.

References

External links
 
 

2019 films
2010s Sinhala-language films
Films set in the Crisis of the Sixteenth Century
Sri Lankan historical drama films
2010s historical drama films
2019 drama films